Ornament and Crime is the seventh studio album by American rock band Self. Originally intended for release in August 2004, it was delayed by the dissolution of Self's label, DreamWorks Records.  It was eventually released independently thirteen years later, in August 2017, which also saw the physical release of previously Internet-only B-side album, Porno, Mint & Grime.  Prior to this, Ornament and Crime was only legally available via streaming on Self's Myspace and YouTube channels.

Track listing 

 Hellbent (03:09)
 Emotional (03:27)
 Insecure Sober (02:23)
 Pathetic Song (03:21)
 How Can I Make You Happy (03:13)
 Can't Go On (04:05)
 Coming Over (04:03)
 No One Knows You (02:43)
 Grow Up (03:22)
 The Pounding Truth (03:18)
 Out With A Bang (03:32)
 L.A. Radio (02:27)

Notes

Albums free for download by copyright owner
Self (band) albums
2004 albums
2017 albums